You Su-mi is a South Korean taekwondo practitioner. 

She won a gold medal in flyweight at the 1993 World Taekwondo Championships in New York City, after defeating Águeda Pérez López in the final.

References

External links

Year of birth missing (living people)
Living people
South Korean female taekwondo practitioners
World Taekwondo Championships medalists
20th-century South Korean women